Gibberula mamillata is a species of sea snail, a marine gastropod mollusk, in the family Cystiscidae.

Description
The length of the shell attains 1.9 mm.

Distribution
This marine species occurs off Réunion.

References

mamillata
Gastropods described in 2014